Tam Hòa is a ward located in Biên Hòa city of Đồng Nai province, Vietnam. It has an area of about 1.2km2 and the population in 2017 was 17,851.

References

Bien Hoa